The following is a timeline of the presidency of Joe Biden during the third quarter of 2022, from July 1 to September 30, 2022. To navigate between quarters, see timeline of the Joe Biden presidency.

Timeline

July 2022

August 2022

September 2022

See also
 Presidential transition of Joe Biden
 List of executive actions by Joe Biden
 List of presidential trips made by Joe Biden (international trips)
 Timeline of the 2020 United States presidential election

References

2022 Q3
Presidency of Joe Biden
July 2022 events in the United States
August 2022 events in the United States
September 2022 events in the United States
Political timelines of the 2020s by year
2022 timelines
Articles containing video clips